Honson Chin (born 12 January 1956) is a former Jamaican cyclist. He competed in the sprint and tandem events at the 1972 Summer Olympics.

References

External links
 

1956 births
Living people
Jamaican male cyclists
Olympic cyclists of Jamaica
Cyclists at the 1972 Summer Olympics
Place of birth missing (living people)